Cyperus castaneus is a sedge of the family Cyperaceae that is native to parts of northern Australia, southern Africa, India and south east Asia.

The plant blooms between February and July producing yellow-brown flowers.

In Western Australia it is found around clay pans and other damp areas in the Kimberley, Pilbara and Goldfields-Esperance regions. It is also found in Queensland and the Northern Territory. In Africa it is found in Namibia and the Northern Provinces of South Africa, in Asia its range extends from India in the west through to China in the east and down to Indonesia and Borneo in the south.

There are two known varieties of the species:
Cyperus castaneus var. brevimucronatus Kük.
Cyperus castaneus Willd. var. castaneus

See also
List of Cyperus species

References

Plants described in 1797
Flora of Western Australia
castaneus
Taxa named by Carl Ludwig Willdenow
Flora of Queensland
Flora of the Northern Territory
Flora of New South Wales
Flora of Namibia
Flora of South Africa
Flora of India
Flora of Borneo
Flora of China
Flora of Cambodia
Flora of Malaysia
Flora of Nepal
Flora of Myanmar
Flora of Sri Lanka
Flora of Sumatra
Flora of Thailand
Flora of Vietnam